Pachypleurosauria is an extinct clade of primitive sauropterygian reptiles that vaguely resembled aquatic lizards, and were limited to the Triassic period. The limb girdles are greatly reduced, so it is unlikely these animals could move about on land. The widely spaced peg-like teeth project at the front of the jaws, indicating that these animals fed on fish. In the species Prosantosaurus, it was observed that they fed on small fishes and crustaceans which they devoured entirely and that its teeth regrew after they broke off. This was the first observation of tooth replacement in a European pachypleurosaur, the only other discovery of such an event was made in China.

Classification
Pachypleurosaurs were originally and are often still included within the Nothosauroidea (Carroll 1988, Benton 2004). In some more recent cladistic classifications, however, (Rieppel 2000), they are considered the sister group to the Eosauropterygia, the clade that includes the nothosaurs and plesiosaurs. In the 2023 description of Luopingosaurus, Xu et al. found support for a similar hypothesis, recovering Pachypleurosauroidea as the sister taxon to the Eusauropterygia, a clade which contains both Nothosauroidea and Pistosauroidea. The results of their phylogenetic analyses are shown in the cladogram below:

Sources
 Benton, M. J. (2004), Vertebrate Paleontology, 3rd ed. Blackwell Science Ltd  
 Carroll, R.L. (1988), Vertebrate Paleontology and Evolution, WH Freeman & Co.
 Rieppel, O., (2000), Sauropterygia I, placodontia, pachypleurosauria, nothosauroidea, pistosauroidea: In: Handbuch der Palaoherpetologie, part 12A, 134pp. Verlag Dr. Friedrich Pfeil Table of contents

References

External links
 Lepidosauromorpha: Pachypleurosauridae - Palaeos

Triassic sauropterygians